Parisangulocrinus is an extinct genus of crinoids from the Early Devonian of Europe.

Sources

 Fossils (Smithsonian Handbooks) by David Ward (Page 166)
Parisangulocrinus in the Paleobiology Database

Cladida
Prehistoric crinoid genera
Devonian animals of Europe